Maricar Reyes-Poon (born Maricar Concepcion Pozon Reyes; June 20, 1981), is a Filipino actress.

Early life
Reyes was born in Cagayan de Oro, Philippines. She graduated high school from St. Bridget's School in Quezon City. She finished her Bachelor of Science Degree in Biology at the Ateneo de Manila University and studied Medicine at the University of Santo Tomas Faculty of Medicine and Surgery. She passed the medical licensure exam in 2008.

Career
Before becoming an actress, Reyes appeared in numerous TV and print advertisements in the Philippines and across Southeast Asia. Her first role came in 2008 via ABS-CBN's Komiks Presents: Kapitan Boom, where she played a younger version of a character portrayed by Gloria Sevilla. She also appeared on I Love Betty La Fea and Precious Hearts Romances Presents: Bud Brothers, which earned her the Star Awards for TV for Best New Female TV Personality.

In 2009, Reyes appeared in May Bukas Pa wherein she played the role of Ina, a woman who lost her sanity because of a dark past. She also appeared in her first starring role in the series Your Song Presents: Gaano Kita Kamahal.

The same year, she was nominated for the Star Awards for Movies' New Movie Actress of the Year for the film And I Love You So, following a Cinema One Originals Film Festival Award for Best Actress in 2011 for her performance in Anatomiya ng Korupsiyon, where she played an idealistic young lawyer hired to replace a previous hearing officer in an unidentified family court. She was also nominated for a Metro Manila Film Festival Award for Best Actress for her performance in Shake, Rattle & Roll 13 as a blind mother.

Personal life
Reyes became a born-again Christian and attended Victory Christian Fellowship, where she met singer Richard Poon, with whom she had a relationship since 2012. In April 2013, Poon confirmed that he and Reyes had been engaged. They married in June 2013.

Filmography

Television

Film

Awards and nominations

Notes

References

External links
 

1981 births
Living people
Filipino film actresses
Filipino television actresses
Filipino Christians
Star Magic
Filipino women medical doctors
Ateneo de Manila University alumni
University of Santo Tomas alumni